Lulu von Strauss und Torney (1873–1956) was a German poet and writer. Best remembered for her ballads, she also wrote historical fiction with rural settings in northwest Germany.

Life
Lulu von Strauss und Torney was born in 1873 in Bückeburg. She was the daughter of a German general, who had served as an adjutant at the court of the Prince of Schaumberg-Lippe. She studied in Bückeburg.

In her twenties she began to write poetry and ballads, contributing to the ballad's early-20th-century revival as a genre. Encouraged by Börries von Münchhausen, she wrote from 1901 to 1905 for Münchhausen's literary magazine Göttinger Musenalmanach. Her 1911 novel Judas was later reworked as the 1937 Der Judenhof.

In 1916 she married the publisher Eugen Diederichs, settling with him in Jena. Another collection of ballads appeared in 1919. In 1921 she wrote the play Der Tempel. Her 1922 novel Der jüngste Tag treated the Münster rebellion by Anabaptists. Her politics moved to the right, and she proclaimed Hans Grimm's 1926 novel Volk ohne Raum to be "a German spiritual event". 

She published a biography of her husband after his death, and her own memoirs in 1943. Correspondence with Agnes Miegel and with Theodor Heuss was posthumously published. She also translated from the French.

Works

References

1873 births
1956 deaths
People from Bückeburg
Ballads
German poets
German women poets
20th-century German novelists
German historical novelists
German women novelists
German autobiographers
French–German translators
Lula